"The Only One I Know" is the second single by English rock band the Charlatans. It was their first top-10 hit, reaching  9 on the UK Singles Chart. In the UK it was the highest-charting single from the Some Friendly album. Its best showing in the US was on the Modern Rock Chart, where it reached No. 5 in September 1990.

The song contained lines directly lifted from the Byrds' 1967 song "Everybody's Been Burned," while the melody prominently features an organ riff lifted from the Deep Purple rendition of the song "Hush". In addition, Martin Blunt has described Jon Baker's guitar part as resembling that of the Supremes' "You Keep Me Hangin' On". Tim Burgess has described the song as being "about teenage feelings: I like somebody, why do they not like me? I was 21 or 22, but still had those powerful emotions". According to him, the band initially intended to record a different song, "Polar Bear", for release as their second single, but after both a friend of Burgess' and their record label Beggars Banquet Records suggested that "The Only One I Know" would be a better choice they changed plans. Burgess has described the song as having an unusual construction: "I’m still not sure which bit is the chorus. The title and main hook is in the verse, but the intro – before the main song crashes in – gives people just enough time to get on the dancefloor". Blunt has said that the breakdown to his bass part after the second verse was influenced by funk and Stax Records' southern soul sound. After the band recorded the track at The Winding Studios in Wrexham, it underwent further mixing by Chris Nagle at Strawberry Studios in Stockport.

The song was included as a track on the influential compilation album Happy Daze. A funk-styled cover version with vocals by Robbie Williams appeared on Mark Ronson's 2007 album, Version. In 2010, the song was used in a TV advert for Cadbury's chocolate. In 2012 the song featured in the film California Solo.

Tim Burgess, in his memoir Telling Stories, says the single went on to sell 250,000 copies.

Track listings
All tracks were written by Brookes, Day, Collins, Blunt and Burgess except "Then", written by Brookes, Collins, Blunt and Burgess.

7-inch single
"The Only One I Know" – 3:56
"Everything Changed" – 3:21

12-inch single
A1. "The Only One I Know" – 4:00
B1. "Imperial 109" (edit) – 3:44
B2. "Everything Changed" – 3:23

UK CD single
"The Only One I Know" – 3:56
"Imperial 109" (edit) – 3:41
"Everything Changed" – 3:21
"You Can Talk to Me" – 4:49
"You Can Talk to Me" was recorded on 20 March 1990 for the John Peel Show, BBC Radio 1, first broadcast on 9 April 1990. The US CD single switches tracks two and three.

US cassette single
"The Only One I Know" (edit) – 3:25
"Then" (alternative take) – 5:45

Charts

Certifications

Release history

References

1990 singles
1990 songs
The Charlatans (English band) songs
Mark Ronson songs
RCA Records singles
Song recordings produced by Mark Ronson